Pyroxasulfone is a pre-emergence herbicide that inhibits the production of very long chain fatty acids in plants. The structure of the existing herbicide thiobencarb served as the basis for development but pyroxasulfone requires a lower dose (100–25 g/ha) and is more stable resulting in longer efficacy.  it had been registered for use in Japan, Australia, USA, Canada, Saudi Arabia and South Africa and was used on crops including maize, soybean, wheat and cotton. In 2015 it was applied to over 6 million hectares of land. Pyroxasulfone is from a novel chemical class but has a similar mode of action to acetamide herbicides such as metolachlor, acetochlor and dimethenamid. It is mainly used to control annual grasses but is also effective against broadleaf weeds including lambsquarters (Chenopodium berlandieri), pigweed and waterhemp (both Amaranthus species) and black nightshade (Solanum nigrum)

References

Further reading

Herbicides
Pyrazoles
Oxazoles
Sulfones
Trifluoromethyl compounds